MacNicol is a surname. It is a patronymic form of the personal name Nicol, which is a form of Nicholas.  It comes from both German and Celtic origins.

The surname may refer to:

People
Bessie MacNicol (1869-1904), a Scottish painter.
Donald MacNicol (1735-1802), a Scottish clergyman.
John Ritchie MacNicol (1878-1950), a Canadian politician. 
Peter MacNicol (born 1954), an American actor.

References

Scottish surnames
Patronymic surnames
Surnames from given names